Route 122A is a  southeast-northwest state highway in Massachusetts, in the United States. It is an alternate route of Massachusetts Route 122, with a mile-long concurrency with its parent route in downtown Worcester.

Route description
Route 122A begins in the Farnumsville section of Grafton at its parent route. Route 122A heads westward, crossing the Blackstone River and following it through the northwest corner of Sutton and into Millbury. In Millbury, Route 122A crosses the river again, passing through the center of town before meeting Route 146, near the Shoppes at Blackstone Valley shopping center. The two routes travel northward, with a combined exit to U.S. Route 20 and the Massachusetts Turnpike (I-90) shortly after the merge, and just before the two routes enter Worcester.

In Worcester, Route 122A leaves Route 146 at Providence Street, following it and Winthrop Street until crossing I-290 at Exit 13. Just after this, Route 122A meets Route 122 at Kelley Square, running concurrently with its parent route westward past Polar Park until the two meet Route 9 and Route 12. Route 122A then turns northward concurrently with the two routes, with Route 9 leaving the concurrency a few blocks north, before Route 122A splits from Route 12, turning northwestward and following the shores of Indian Lake near Assumption College. Route 122A then enters the town of Holden.  

Route 122A passes through Chaffinville and past Chaffin Pond before intersecting Route 31 at Holden Center. It continues northward, passing Eagle Lake and Stump Pond before meeting the southern end of Route 68. Route 122A bends westward into the town of Rutland, where it shares a short concurrency with Route 56 before finally ending at its parent route once more, in Rutland State Park.

Major intersections

References

External links

122A